Robusticoelotes is a genus of East Asian funnel weavers first described by X. P. Wang in 2002.  it contains only three species.

References

External links

Agelenidae
Araneomorphae genera
Spiders of China